The Police Cross for Distinguished Service was a medal awarded by the President of Rhodesia.

History 

The Police Cross for Distinguished Service was awarded for Distinguished Police Service.

Description 

A silver and gold-plated 38mm Maltese Cross with, at the centre a gold lion and spear police crest on a circle of white enamel, surrounded by the words in gold lettering "For Distinguished Police Service" on a blue background. The reverse is plain and carried the name of the recipient.

References 

Distinguished service awards
Orders, decorations, and medals of Rhodesia
Law enforcement awards and honors